Monophorus per versus is a species of minute sea snail with left-handed shell-coiling, a marine gastropod mollusk or micromollusk in the family Triphoridae.

Distribution
This species is found in the Azores, around Great Britain and in European waters including the Mediterranean Sea.

Description

References

External links

Triphoridae
Gastropods described in 1758
Taxa named by Carl Linnaeus